Denyse Alexander ( Denyse Verena Macpherson ; born 28 June 1931) is a British stage, film and television actress. 

She was married to the film and television director Jack Gold from 1957 until his death in August 2015.

Selected filmography

Film roles
 Orders to Kill (1958)
 The Medusa Touch (1978)
 The Sailor's Return (1978)
 Lady Jane (1986)

Television roles
 Inspector Morse
 Foyle's War
 Fawlty Towers (episode The Anniversary, 1979)
 Midsomer Murders
 Dramarama
 Heavy Weather (TV film of Sir P. G. Wodehouse's book)

References

External links
 

1931 births
Living people
British stage actresses
British film actresses
British television actresses